The Direction générale de la statistique et des études économique (DGSEE) is the official statistical service of Gabon, established in its current form in 1976. Its activities are organized within the broader framework of the statistical system of Gabon.
The DGSEE is a branch of the central government under the authority of the Minister responsible for Statistics. On 31 May 1983, its powers and organization were identified by a decree. Very generally, DGSEE is responsible for ensuring the technical coordination of the national statistical system and to disseminate statistical data for the purposes of the government, private sector, development partners and the public. Affiliated with Afristat, since 2009 it has been led by Francis Thierry Tiwinot.

References

External links
Official site 

Gabon
Organizations based in Gabon
Government agencies of Gabon
Organizations established in 1976
1976 establishments in Gabon